This list of carnivorous plants is a comprehensive listing of all known carnivorous plant species, of which more than 750 are currently recognised. Unless otherwise stated it is based on Jan Schlauer's Carnivorous Plant Database. Extinct taxa are denoted with a dagger (†).

Some of the species on this list may not satisfy certain strict definitions of plant carnivory, and could alternatively be characterised as merely paracarnivorous or protocarnivorous.

Extant species

Aldrovanda

This genus contains a single extant species.

Aldrovanda vesiculosa L., 1753

Brocchinia
This genus contains around 20 extant species, of which at least two are thought to be carnivorous.

Brocchinia hechtioides Mez, 1913
Brocchinia reducta Baker, 1882

Byblis
The following list of 8 species is based on Carnivorous Plants of Australia Magnum Opus (2013).

Byblis aquatica Lowrie & Conran, 1998
Byblis filifolia Planch., 1848
Byblis gigantea Lindl., 1839
Byblis guehoi Lowrie & Conran, 2008
Byblis lamellata Lowrie & Conran, 2002			
Byblis liniflora Salisb., 1808
Byblis pilbarana Lowrie & Conran, 2013
Byblis rorida Lowrie & Conran, 1998

Catopsis
This genus contains around 20 extant species, of which at least one is thought to be carnivorous.

Catopsis berteroniana Mez, 1896

Cephalotus
This genus contains a single extant species.
Cephalotus follicularis Labill., 1806

Darlingtonia
This genus contains a single extant species.
Darlingtonia californica Torr., 1853

Dionaea

This genus contains a single extant species.

Dionaea muscipula Soland. ex Ellis, 1773

Drosera
 There are around 208 species here:

{{columns-list|colwidth=32em|
Drosera aberrans (Lowrie ex Lowrie & Carlquist) Lowrie & Conran, 2008 (Bas.: Drosera whittakeri subsp. aberrans)
Drosera acaulis L.f., 1781
Drosera adelae	F.Muell., 1864		
Drosera affinis Welw. ex Oliv., 1871
Drosera afra Debbert, 2002
Drosera alba Phill., 1913
Drosera aliciae R.Hamet, 1905
Drosera amazonica Rivadavia et al.
Drosera andersoniana W.Fitzg. ex Ewart. & White, 1909
Drosera androsacea Diels, 1904
Drosera anglica Huds., 1778
Drosera aquatica Lowrie, 2013
Drosera arcturi Hook., 1834 
Drosera arenicola Steyerm., 1952
Drosera aurantiaca Lowrie, 2013
Drosera australis (N.G.Marchant & Lowrie) Lowrie & Conran, 2013 (Bas.: Drosera occidentalis subsp. australis)
Drosera banksii R.Br. ex DC., 1824
Drosera barbigera Planch., 1848
Drosera barrettiorum Lowrie, 2013
Drosera basifolia (N.G.Marchant & Lowrie) Lowrie, 2013 (Bas.: Drosera menziesii subsp. basifolia)
Drosera bequaertii Taton, 1945
Drosera biflora Willd. ex Roem. & Schult., 1820
Drosera binata	Labill., 1804
Drosera bindoon Lowrie, 2013
Drosera brevicornis Lowrie, 1996
Drosera brevifolia Pursh, 1814
Drosera broomensis Lowrie, 1996
Drosera browniana Lowrie & N.G.Marchant, 1992
Drosera bulbigena Morr., 1903
Drosera bulbosa Hook., 1814
Drosera burkeana Planch., 1848
Drosera burmannii Vahl, 1794		
Drosera caduca	Lowrie, 1996		
Drosera callistos N.G.Marchant & Lowrie, 1992
Drosera camporupestris F.Rivadavia, 2003 
Drosera capensis L., 1753		
Drosera capillaris Poir., 1804		
Drosera cayennensis Sagot ex Diels, 1906
Drosera cendeensis Tamayo & Croizat, 1949
Drosera chrysolepis Taub., 1893		
Drosera cistiflora L., 1760		
Drosera citrina Lowrie & Carlquist, 1992
Drosera closterostigma N.G.Marchant & Lowrie, 1992
Drosera coalara Lowrie & Conran, 2013
Drosera collina (N.G.Marchant & Lowrie) Lowrie, 2013 (Bas.: Drosera erythrorhiza subsp. collina)
Drosera collinsiae Brown ex Burtt Davy, 1924
Drosera colombiana Fernandez-Perez, 1965
Drosera communis A.St.-Hil., 1824
Drosera coomallo Lowrie & Conran, 2013
Drosera cucullata Lowrie, 2013
Drosera cuneifolia L.f., 1781
Drosera darwinensis Lowrie, 1996
Drosera depauperata Lowrie & Conran, 2013
Drosera derbyensis Lowrie, 1996
Drosera dichrosepala Turcz., 1854
Drosera dielsiana Exell & Laundon, 1956	
Drosera dilatato-petiolaris K.Kondo, 1984
Drosera echinoblastus N.G.Marchant & Lowrie, 1992
Drosera elongata Exell & Laundon, 1995
Drosera eneabba N.G.Marchant & Lowrie, 1992
Drosera eremaea (N.G.Marchant & Lowrie) Lowrie & Conran, 2013 (Bas.: Drosera macrantha subsp. eremaea)
Drosera ericgreenii A.Fleischm., Gibson & F.Rivadavia, 2008
Drosera ericksoniae N.G.Marchant & Lowrie, 1992
Drosera erythrogyne N.G.Marchant & Lowrie, 1992
Drosera erythrorhiza Lindl., 1839		
Drosera esmeraldae (Steyerm.) Maguire & Wurdack, 1957 (Bas.:Drosera tenella var.esmeraldae)
Drosera esperensis Lowrie, 2013
Drosera falconeri Tsang ex K.Kondo, 1984			
Drosera felix Steyerm. & L.B.Smith, 1974
Drosera filiformis Raf., 1808
Drosera fimbriata De Buhr, 1975
Drosera fragrans Lowrie, 2013
Drosera fulva Planch., 1848
Drosera geniculata (N.G.Marchant & Lowrie) Lowrie, 2013 (Bas.: Drosera gigantea subsp. geniculata)
Drosera gibsonii P.Mann, 2007
Drosera gigantea Lindl., 1839
Drosera glabripes (Harv. ex Planch.) Stein, 1886 (Bas.:Drosera ramentacea var. glabripes)
Drosera glabriscapa Lowrie, 2013	
Drosera glanduligera Lehm., 1844
Drosera graminifolia A.St.-Hil., 1824
Drosera graniticola N.G.Marchant, 1982
Drosera graomogolensis T.Silva, 1997
Drosera grantsaui Rivadavia, 2003
Drosera grievei Lowrie & N.G.Marchant, 1992
Drosera hamiltonii C.R.P.Andrews, 1903
Drosera hartmeyerorum Schlauer, 2001
Drosera helodes N.G.Marchant & Lowrie, 1992
Drosera heterophylla Lindl., 1839
Drosera hilaris Cham. & Schlechtd., 1826
Drosera hirsuta Lowrie & Conran, 2013	
Drosera hirtella A.St.-Hil., 1824
Drosera hirticalyx R.Duno & Culham, 1995
Drosera huegelii Endl., 1837
Drosera humbertii Exell & Laundon, 1956
Drosera hyperostigma N.G.Marchant & Lowrie, 1992
Drosera indica L., 1753
Drosera indumenta Lowrie & Conran, 2013
Drosera insolita Taton, 1954
Drosera intermedia Hayne, 1800	
Drosera intricata Planch., 1848 	
Drosera kaieteurensis Brumm.-Ding., 1955
Drosera katangensis Taton, 1945
Drosera kenneallyi Lowrie, 1996
Drosera lanata	K.Kondo, 1984		
Drosera lasiantha Lowrie & Carlquist, 1992		
Drosera leucoblasta Benth., 1864
Drosera linearis Goldie, 1822	
Drosera lowriei N.G.Marchant, 1992
Drosera macrantha Endl., 1837	
Drosera macrophylla Lindl., 1839
Drosera madagascariensis DC., 1824
Drosera magna (N.G.Marchant & Lowrie) Lowrie, 2013 (Bas.: Drosera erythrorhiza subsp. magna)
Drosera magnifica Rivadavia & Gonella, 2015
Drosera major (Diels) Lowrie, 2013 (Bas.: Drosera bulbosa var. major)
Drosera mannii Cheek, 1990
Drosera marchantii De Buhr, 1975
Drosera menziesii R.Br. ex DC., 1824	
Drosera meristocaulis Maguire & Wurdack, 1957
Drosera micra Lowrie & Conran, 2013
Drosera microphylla Endl., 1837
Drosera miniata Diels, 1904
Drosera modesta Diels, 1904
Drosera monantha (Lowrie & Carlquist) Lowrie, 2013 (Bas.: Drosera macrophylla subsp. monantha)	
Drosera montana A.St.-Hil., 1824
Drosera monticola (Lowrie & N.G.Marchant) Lowrie, 2011 (Bas.: Drosera stolonifera subsp. monticola)
Drosera moorei (Diels) A.Lowrie, 1999  (Bas.: Drosera subhirtella var.moorei) 
Drosera myriantha Planch., 1848
Drosera nana Lowrie, 2013
Drosera natalensis Diels, 1906
Drosera neesii Lehm., 1844
Drosera neocaledonica R.Hamet, 1906		
Drosera nidiformis Debbert, 1991		
Drosera nitidula Planch., 1848	
Drosera oblanceolata Y.Z.Ruan, 1981
Drosera occidentalis Morr., 1912
Drosera orbiculata N.G.Marchant & Lowrie, 1992	
Drosera ordensis Lowrie, 1994		
Drosera oreopodion N.G.Marchant & Lowrie, 1992
Drosera paleacea DC., 1824
Drosera pallida Lindl., 1839
Drosera panamensis Correa & A.S.Taylor, 1976
Drosera paradoxa Lowrie, 1997
Drosera parvula Planch., 1848
Drosera pauciflora Banks ex DC., 1824
Drosera pedicellaris Lowrie, 2002
Drosera peltata Thunb., 1797
Drosera peruensis T.Silva & M.D.Correa, 
Drosera petiolaris R.Br. ex DC., 1824	
Drosera pilosa Exell & Laundon, 1956
Drosera platypoda Turcz., 1854
Drosera platystigma Lehm., 1844
Drosera praefolia Tepper, 1892
Drosera prolifera C.T.White, 1940
Drosera prophylla (N.G.Marchant & Lowrie) Lowrie, 2013	(Bas.: Drosera marchantii subsp. prophylla)	
Drosera prostratoscaposa Lowrie & Carlquist, 1990
Drosera pulchella Lehm., 1844		
Drosera pycnoblasta Diels, 1904
Drosera pygmaea DC., 1824
Drosera quartzicola Rivadavia & Gonella, 2011		
Drosera radicans N.G.Marchant, 1982
Drosera ramellosa Lehm., 1844	
Drosera ramentacea Burch. ex DC., 1824
Drosera rechingeri Strid, 1987
Drosera regia	Stephens, 1926		
Drosera roraimae (Klotzsch ex Diels) Maguire & Laundon, 1957 (Bas.: Drosera montana var.roraimae) 
Drosera rosulata Lehm., 1844		
Drosera rotundifolia L., 1753		
Drosera salina N.G.Marchant & Lowrie, 1992
Drosera schizandra Diels, 1906
Drosera schmutzii Lowrie & Conran, 2008
Drosera schwackei (Diels) F.Rivadavia, 2008 (Bas.: Drosera montana var. schwackei)Drosera scorpioides Planch., 1848		Drosera sessilifolia A.St.-Hil., 1824Drosera sewelliae Diels, 1904		Drosera slackii Cheek, 1987Drosera solaris A.Fleischm., Wistuba & S.McPherson, 2007	Drosera spatulata Labill., 1804		Drosera spilos N.G.Marchant & Lowrie, 1992Drosera spiralis A.St.-Hil., 1826Drosera stenopetala Hook.f., 1853		Drosera stolonifera  Endl., 1837	Drosera stricticaulis (Diels) O.H.Sargent, 1913 (Bas.: Drosera macrantha var.stricticaulis)Drosera subhirtella Planch., 1848Drosera subtilis N.G.Marchant, 1982Drosera sulphurea Lehm., 1884  Drosera tentaculata F.Rivadavia, 2003Drosera tokaiensis (Komiya & C.Shibata) T.Nakam. & K.Ueda, 1991 (Bas.: Drosera spatulata subsp. tokaiensis)Drosera tomentosa A.St.-Hil., 1824Drosera trichocaulis (Diels) Lowrie & Conran, 2013 (Bas.: Drosera paleacea var. trichocaulis)Drosera trinervia Spreng., 1820		Drosera tubaestylis N.G.Marchant & Lowrie, 1992Drosera ultramafica A.Fleischm., A.S.Rob. & S.McPherson, 2011	Drosera uniflora Willd., 1809Drosera venusta P.Debbert, 1987Drosera verrucata Lowrie & Conran, 2013Drosera villosa A.St.-Hil., 1824Drosera viridis F.Rivadavia, 2003			Drosera walyunga N.G.Marchant & Lowrie, 1992Drosera whittakeri Planch, 1848Drosera yutajensis R.Duno & Culham, 1995Drosera zeyheri T.M.Salter, 1940Drosera zigzagia A.Lowrie, 1999 Drosera zonaria Planch., 1848
}}

Drosophyllum

This genus contains a single extant species.Drosophyllum lusitanicum (L.) Link, 1805 (Bas.: Drosera lusitanica)

Genlisea
The following list of 29 species is based on Monograph of the Genus Genlisea (2012).Genlisea africana Oliv., 1865Genlisea angolensis R.D.Good, 1924Genlisea aurea A.St.-Hil., 1833Genlisea barthlottii S.Porembski, Eb.Fisch. & Gemmel, 1996Genlisea exhibitionista Rivadavia & A.Fleischm., 2011Genlisea filiformis A.St.-Hil., 1833Genlisea flexuosa Rivadavia, A.Fleischm. & Gonella, 2011Genlisea glabra P.Taylor, 1967Genlisea glandulosissima R.E.Fr., 1916Genlisea guianensis N.E.Br., 1900Genlisea hispidula Stapf, 1904Genlisea lobata Fromm, 1989Genlisea margaretae Hutch., 1946Genlisea metallica Rivadavia & A.Fleischm., 2011Genlisea nebulicola Rivadavia, Gonella & A.Fleischm., 2011Genlisea nigrocaulis Steyerm., 1948Genlisea oligophylla Rivadavia & A.Fleischm., 2011Genlisea oxycentron P.Taylor, 1954Genlisea pallida Fromm & P.Taylor, 1985Genlisea pulchella Tutin, 1934Genlisea pygmaea A.St.-Hil., 1833Genlisea repens Benj., 1847Genlisea roraimensis N.E.Br., 1901Genlisea sanariapoana Steyerm., 1953Genlisea stapfii A.Chev., 1912Genlisea subglabra Stapf, 1906Genlisea tuberosa Rivadavia, Gonella & A.Fleischm., 2013Genlisea uncinata P.Taylor & Fromm, 1983Genlisea violacea A.St.-Hil., 1833

Heliamphora
The following list of 23 species (plus 2 undescribed species) is based on Sarraceniaceae of South America (2011).Heliamphora arenicola Wistuba, A.Fleischm., Nerz & S.McPherson, 2011Heliamphora ceracea Nerz, Wistuba, Grantsau, Rivadavia, A.Fleischm. & S.McPherson, 2011Heliamphora chimantensis Wistuba, Carow & Harbarth, 2002Heliamphora ciliata Wistuba, Nerz & A.Fleischm., 2009Heliamphora collina Wistuba, Nerz, S.McPherson & A.Fleischm., 2011Heliamphora elongata Nerz, 2004Heliamphora exappendiculata (Maguire & Steyermark) Nerz & Wistuba, 2006 (Bas.: Heliamphora heterodoxa var. exappendiculata)Heliamphora folliculata Wistuba, Harbarth & Carow, 2001 Heliamphora glabra Nerz, Wistuba & Hoogenstrijd, 2006Heliamphora heterodoxa Steyerm., 1951Heliamphora hispida Wistuba & Nerz, 2000Heliamphora huberi A.Fleischm., Wistuba & Nerz, 2009Heliamphora ionasi Maguire, 1978Heliamphora macdonaldae Gleason, 1931	Heliamphora minor Gleason, 1939 Heliamphora neblinae Maguire, 1978Heliamphora nutans Benth., 1840Heliamphora parva (Maguire) S.McPherson, A.Fleischm., Wistuba & Nerz, 2011 (Bas.: Heliamphora neblinae var. parva)Heliamphora pulchella Wistuba, Carow, Harbarth & Nerz, 2005Heliamphora purpurascens Wistuba, A.Fleischm., Nerz & S.McPherson, 2011Heliamphora sarracenioides Carow, Wistuba & Harbarth, 2005 Heliamphora tatei Gleason, 1931Heliamphora uncinata Nerz, Wistuba & A.Fleischm., 2009
Heliamphora sp. 'Akopán Tepui'
Heliamphora sp. 'Angasima Tepui'

Nepenthes

The following list of 170 species (plus 2 undescribed species) is based on Pitcher Plants of the Old World (2009) and New Nepenthes (2011), with the addition of newly described species.Nepenthes abalata Jebb & Cheek, 2013Nepenthes abgracilis Jebb & Cheek, 2013Nepenthes adnata Tamin & M.Hotta ex Schlauer, 1994Nepenthes aenigma Nuytemans, W.Suarez & Calaramo, 2016Nepenthes alata Blanco, 1837Nepenthes alba Ridl., 1924Nepenthes albomarginata  T.Lobb ex Lindl., 1849Nepenthes alzapan Jebb & Cheek, 2013Nepenthes ampullaria	Jack, 1835Nepenthes andamana M.Catal., 2010Nepenthes angasanensis Maulder, B.R.Salmon, Schub. & Quinn., 1999Nepenthes appendiculata Chi C.Lee, Bourke, Rembold, W.Taylor & S.T.Yeo, 2011Nepenthes argentii  Jebb & Cheek, 1997Nepenthes aristolochioides  Jebb & Cheek, 1997Nepenthes armin Jebb & Cheek, 2014Nepenthes attenboroughii A.S.Rob., S.McPherson & V.B.Heinrich, 2009Nepenthes barcelonae Tandang & Cheek, 2015Nepenthes beccariana Macfarl., 1908 Nepenthes bellii  K.Kondo, 1969 Nepenthes benstonei  C.Clarke, 1999 Nepenthes bicalcarata	Hook.f., 1873Nepenthes bokorensis Mey, 2009Nepenthes bongso  Korth., 1839Nepenthes boschiana  Korth., 1839Nepenthes burbidgeae  Hook.f. ex Burb., 1882Nepenthes burkei  Hort.Veitch ex Mast., 1889Nepenthes campanulata  Sh.Kurata, 1973Nepenthes ceciliae Gronem., Coritico, Micheler, Marwinski, Acil & V.B.Amoroso, 2011Nepenthes chang M.Catal., 2010Nepenthes chaniana C.Clarke, Chi C.Lee & S.McPherson, 2006Nepenthes cid Jebb & Cheek, 2013Nepenthes clipeata  Danser, 1928Nepenthes copelandii Merr. ex Macfarl., 1908Nepenthes cornuta Marwinski, Coritico, Wistuba, Micheler, Gronem., Gieray & V.B.Amoroso, 2014Nepenthes danseri  Jebb & Cheek, 1997Nepenthes deaniana  Macfarl., 1908Nepenthes densiflora  Danser, 1940Nepenthes diabolica  A.Bianchi, Chi.C.Lee, Golos, Mey, M.Mansur & A.S.Rob.Nepenthes diatas  Jebb & Cheek, 1997Nepenthes distillatoria  L., 1753Nepenthes dubia  Danser, 1928Nepenthes edwardsiana  H.Low ex Hook.f., 1859Nepenthes ephippiata  Danser, 1928Nepenthes epiphytica A.S.Rob., Nerz & Wistuba, 2011Nepenthes eustachya  Miq., 1858Nepenthes extincta Jebb & Cheek, 2013Nepenthes eymae  Sh.Kurata, 1984			Nepenthes faizaliana  J.H.Adam & Wilcock, 1991Nepenthes flava Wistuba, Nerz & A.Fleischm., 2007Nepenthes fusca  Danser, 1928Nepenthes gantungensis S.McPherson, Cervancia, Chi C.Lee, Jaunzems, Mey & A.S.Rob., 2010Nepenthes glabrata  J.R.Turnbull & A.T.Middleton, 1984Nepenthes glandulifera Chi C.Lee, 2004Nepenthes graciliflora Elmer, 1912Nepenthes gracilis  Korth., 1839Nepenthes gracillima  Ridl., 1908Nepenthes gymnamphora  Reinw. ex Nees, 1824Nepenthes halmahera Cheek, 2015Nepenthes hamata  J.R.Turnbull & A.T.Middleton, 1984Nepenthes hamiguitanensis Gronem., Wistuba, V.B.Heinrich, S.McPherson, Mey & V.B.Amoroso, 2010Nepenthes hemsleyana Macfarl., 1908Nepenthes hirsuta  Hook.f., 1873Nepenthes hispida Beck, 1895Nepenthes holdenii Mey, 2010Nepenthes hurrelliana Cheek & A.L.Lamb, 2003 Nepenthes inermis  Danser, 1928Nepenthes insignis  Danser, 1928Nepenthes izumiae  Troy Davis, C.Clarke, & Tamin, 2003Nepenthes jacquelineae  C.Clarke, Troy Davis & Tamin, 2001Nepenthes jamban Chi C.Lee, 2006Nepenthes junghuhnii Macfarl. in sched., 1917Nepenthes justinae Gronem., Wistuba, Mey & V.B.Amoroso, 2016Nepenthes kampotiana Lecomte, 1909Nepenthes kerrii M.Catal. & Kruetr., 2010Nepenthes khasiana  Hook.f., 1873Nepenthes kitanglad Jebb & Cheek, 2013Nepenthes klossii  Ridl., 1916Nepenthes kongkandana M.Catal. & Kruetr., 2015Nepenthes krabiensis Nuanlaong, Onsanit, Chusangrach & Suraninpong, 2016Nepenthes lamii  Jebb & Cheek, 1997Nepenthes lavicola  Wistuba & Rischer, 1996Nepenthes leonardoi S.McPherson, Bourke, Cervancia, Jaunzems & A.S.Rob., 2011Nepenthes leyte Jebb & Cheek, 2013Nepenthes lingulata Chi C.Lee, 2006Nepenthes longifolia  Nerz & Wistuba, 1994Nepenthes lowii  Hook.f., 1859Nepenthes macfarlanei  Hemsl., 1905Nepenthes macrophylla  (Marabini) Jebb & Cheek, 1997 (Bas.: Nepenthes edwardsiana subsp.macrophylla) Nepenthes macrovulgaris  J.R.Turnbull & A.T.Middleton, 1987Nepenthes madagascariensis  Poir., 1797Nepenthes mantalingajanensis Nerz & Wistuba, 2007Nepenthes mapuluensis  J.H.Adam & Wilcock, 1990Nepenthes maryae Jebb & Cheek, 2016Nepenthes masoalensis  Schmid-Hollinger, 1977Nepenthes maxima   Reinw. ex Nees, 1824Nepenthes merrilliana  Macfarl., 1911Nepenthes micramphora V.B.Heinrich, S.McPherson, Gronem. & V.B.Amoroso, 2009Nepenthes mikei   B.R.Salmon & Maulder, 1995Nepenthes mindanaoensis  Sh.Kurata, 2001 Nepenthes minima Jebb & Cheek, 2016Nepenthes mira  Jebb & Cheek, 1998Nepenthes mirabilis  (Lour.) Rafarin, 1869 (Bas.: Phyllamphora mirabilis) Nepenthes mollis  Danser, 1928Nepenthes monticola A.S.Rob., Wistuba, Nerz, M.Mansur & S.McPherson, 2011Nepenthes muluensis  M.Hotta, 1996Nepenthes murudensis Culham, 1994Nepenthes naga Akhriadi, Hernawati, Primaldhi & M.Hambali, 2009Nepenthes nebularum G.Mansell & W.Suarez, 2016Nepenthes negros Jebb & Cheek, 2013Nepenthes neoguineensis  Macfarl., 1911Nepenthes nigra Nerz, Wistuba, Chi C.Lee, Bourke, U.Zimm. & S.McPherson, 2011Nepenthes northiana Hook.f., 1881Nepenthes ovata  Nerz & Wistuba, 1994Nepenthes palawanensis S.McPherson, Cervancia, Chi C.Lee, Jaunzems, Mey & A.S.Rob., 2010Nepenthes paniculata Danser, 1928Nepenthes pantaronensis Gieray, Gronem., Wistuba, Marwinski, Micheler, Coritico & V.B.Amoroso, 2014Nepenthes papuana Danser, 1928Nepenthes parvula Gary W.Wilson & S.Venter, 2016Nepenthes peltata Sh.Kurata, 2008Nepenthes pervillei  Blume, 1852 Nepenthes petiolata  Danser, 1928Nepenthes philippinensis  Macfarl., 1908Nepenthes pilosa  Danser, 1928Nepenthes pitopangii Chi C.Lee, S.McPherson, Bourke & M.Mansur, 2009Nepenthes platychila Chi C.Lee, 2002Nepenthes pulchra Gronem., S.McPherson, Coritico, Micheler, Marwinski & V.B.Amoroso, 2011Nepenthes rafflesiana  Jack, 1835Nepenthes rajah  Hook.f., 1859Nepenthes ramispina Ridl., 1909Nepenthes ramos Jebb & Cheek, 2013Nepenthes reinwardtiana  Miq., 1851Nepenthes rhombicaulis  Sh.Kurata, 1973Nepenthes rigidifolia  Akhriadi, Hernawati & Tamin, 2004Nepenthes robcantleyi Cheek, 2011Nepenthes rosea M.Catal. & Kruetr., 2014Nepenthes rowaniae Bail., 1897Nepenthes samar Jebb & Cheek, 2013Nepenthes sanguinea  Lindl., 1849Nepenthes saranganiensis  Sh.Kurata, 2003		Nepenthes sibuyanensis  Nerz, 1998Nepenthes singalana  Becc., 1886Nepenthes smilesii Hemsl., 1895 Nepenthes spathulata  Danser, 1935Nepenthes spectabilis  Danser, 1928		Nepenthes stenophylla  Mast., 1890Nepenthes sumagaya Cheek, 2014Nepenthes sumatrana  (Miq.) Beck, 1895 (Bas.: Nepenthes boschiana var.sumatrana)Nepenthes suratensis M.Catal., 2010Nepenthes surigaoensis Elmer, 1915Nepenthes talaandig Gronem., Coritico, Wistuba, Micheler, Marwinski, Gieray & V.B.Amoroso, 2014Nepenthes talangensis  Nerz & Wistuba, 1994Nepenthes tboli Jebb & Cheek, 2014Nepenthes tenax C.Clarke & R.Kruger, 2006Nepenthes tentaculata  Hook.f., 1873Nepenthes tenuis  Nerz & Wistuba, 1994Nepenthes thai Cheek, 2009Nepenthes thorelii  Lecomte, 1909Nepenthes tobaica  Danser, 1928			Nepenthes tomoriana  Danser, 1928Nepenthes treubiana  Warb., 1851Nepenthes truncata  Macfarl., 1911Nepenthes ultra Jebb & Cheek, 2013Nepenthes undulatifolia Nerz, Wistuba, U.Zimm., Chi C.Lee, Pirade & Pitopang, 2011Nepenthes veitchii  Hook.f., 1859			Nepenthes ventricosa  Blanco, 1837Nepenthes vieillardii  Hook.f., 1873Nepenthes villosa Hook.f., 1852Nepenthes viridis Micheler, Gronem., Wistuba, Marwinski, W.Suarez & V.B.Amoroso, 2013Nepenthes vogelii  Schuit. & de Vogel, 2002Nepenthes weda Cheek, 2015Nepenthes zygon Jebb & Cheek, 2014
Nepenthes sp. Anipahan
Nepenthes sp. Misool

Philcoxia
This genus contains seven extant species, all of which are thought to be carnivorous.Philcoxia bahiensis V.C.Souza & Harley, 2000Philcoxia goiasensis P.Taylor, 2000Philcoxia minensis V.C.Souza & Giul., 2000Philcoxia tuberosa M.L.S.Carvalho & L.P.Queiroz, 2014Philcoxia rhizomatosa A.V.Scatigna & V.C.Souza, 2015Philcoxia maranhensis A.V.Scatigna, 2017Philcoxia courensis A.V.Scatigna, 2017

PinguiculaPinguicula acuminata Benth., 1839Pinguicula agnata  Casper, 1963Pinguicula albida  Wright ex Griseb., 1866Pinguicula algida  Malyschev, 1966		Pinguicula alpina  L., 1753		Pinguicula antarctica	Vahl, 1827	Pinguicula balcanica Casper, 1962 Pinguicula benedicta Barnhart, 1920Pinguicula bissei Casper, 2004Pinguicula caerulea Walt., 1788Pinguicula calderoniae Zamudio Ruiz, 2001		Pinguicula calyptrata  H.B.K., 1817Pinguicula caryophyllacea Casper, 2004Pinguicula casabitoana Jimenez, 1960Pinguicula chilensis Clos, 1849Pinguicula chuquisacensis S.Beck, A.Fleischm. & Borsch, 2008Pinguicula clivorum  Standl. & Steyerm., 1944Pinguicula colimensis	McVaugh & Mickel, 1963Pinguicula conzattii Zamudio Ruiz & van Marm, 2003	Pinguicula corsica  Bern. & Gren. ex Gren. & Godr, 1850Pinguicula crassifolia  Zamudio Ruiz, 1988Pinguicula crenatiloba A.DC., 1844Pinguicula crystallina	Sibth. ex Sibth. & Smith, 1806	Pinguicula cubensis Urquiola & Casper, 2003 Pinguicula cyclosecta	Casper, 1963	Pinguicula debbertiana	Speta & Fuchs, 1992	Pinguicula ehlersiae	Speta & Fuchs, 1982	Pinguicula elizabethiae Zamudio Ruiz, 1999Pinguicula elongata  Benj., 1847Pinguicula emarginata	Zamudio Ruiz & Rzedowski, 1986	Pinguicula esseriana	B.Kirchner, 1981	Pinguicula filifolia  Wright ex Griseb., 1866Pinguicula gigantea  Luhrs, 1995	Pinguicula gracilis	Zamudio Ruiz, 1988Pinguicula grandiflora	 Lam., 1789	Pinguicula greenwoodii  Cheek, 1994Pinguicula gypsicola	Brandeg., 1911Pinguicula habilii Yıldırım, Şenol & Pirhan, 2012Pinguicula hemiepiphytica  Zamudio Ruiz & Rzedowski, 1991	Pinguicula heterophylla  Benth., 1839	Pinguicula ibarrae  Zamudio Ruiz, 2005	Pinguicula imitatrix  Casper, 1963Pinguicula immaculata  Zamudio Ruiz & Lux, 1992Pinguicula infundibuliformis Casper, 2003Pinguicula involuta Ruiz & Pav., 1789Pinguicula ionantha  Godfr., 1961		Pinguicula jackii  Barnhart, 1930Pinguicula jaumavensis  Debbert, 1991Pinguicula kondoi  Casper, 1974	Pinguicula laueana  Speta & Fuchs, 1989		Pinguicula laxifolia  Luhrs, 1995Pinguicula leptoceras	Rchb., 1823	Pinguicula lignicola  Barnhart, 1920Pinguicula lilacina  Schlecht. & Cham., 1830Pinguicula lippoldii Casper, 2007Pinguicula lithophytica C.Panfet-Valdés & P.Temple, 2008Pinguicula longifolia	Ram. ex DC., 1805	Pinguicula lusitanica	L., 1753	Pinguicula lutea Walt., 1788		Pinguicula macroceras  Link, 1820Pinguicula macrophylla	H.B.K., 1817Pinguicula martinezii Zamudio Ruiz, 2005 	Pinguicula mesophytica Zamudio Ruiz, 1997Pinguicula mirandae  Zamudio Ruiz & Salinas, 1996Pinguicula moctezumae  Zamudio Ruiz & R.Z.Ortega, 1994Pinguicula moranensis	H.B.K., 1817	Pinguicula mundi Blanca, Jamilena, Ruiz-Rejon & Zamora, 1996Pinguicula nevadensis (Lindbg.) Casper, 1962 (Bas.: Pinguicula vulgaris subsp. nevadensis) Pinguicula oblongiloba	A.DC., 1844	Pinguicula orchidioides A.DC., 1844	Pinguicula parvifolia  Robinson, 1894Pinguicula pilosa Luhrs, Studnicka & Gluch, 2004Pinguicula planifolia	Chapm., 1897Pinguicula poldinii Steiger & Casper, 2001	Pinguicula potosiensis  Speta & Fuchs, 1989Pinguicula primuliflora  Wood & Godfr., 1957		Pinguicula pumila  Michx., 1803		Pinguicula ramosa  Miyoshi ex Yatabe, 1890Pinguicula rectifolia  Speta & Fuchs, 1989	Pinguicula reticulata	Fuchs ex Schlauer, 1991	Pinguicula rotundiflora  Studnicka, 1985Pinguicula sharpii  Casper & K.Kondo, 1997Pinguicula takakii  Zamudio Ruiz & Rzedowski, 1986Pinguicula toldensis Casper, 2007Pinguicula utricularioides  Zamudio Ruiz & Rzedowski, 1991Pinguicula vallisneriifolia  Webb, 1853	Pinguicula variegata  Turcz., 1840Pinguicula villosa  L., 1753Pinguicula vulgaris L., 1753		Pinguicula zecheri  Speta & Fuchs, 1982

Roridula
This genus contains two extant species.Roridula dentata L., 1764Roridula gorgonias Planch., 1848

Sarracenia
The following list of 8 species is based on Sarraceniaceae of North America (2011).Sarracenia alata (Alph.Wood) Alph.Wood, 1863 (Bas.: Sarracenia gronovii var. alata)      	Sarracenia flava L., 1753Sarracenia leucophylla Raf., 1817Sarracenia minor Walt., 1788Sarracenia oreophila (Kearney) Wherry, 1933 (Bas.: Sarracenia flava var. oreophila) 	Sarracenia psittacina Michx., 1803 Sarracenia purpurea L., 1753Sarracenia rubra Walt., 1788

Some authorities additionally recognise up to three more species:Sarracenia alabamensis Case & R.B.Case, 2005Sarracenia jonesii Wherry, 1929Sarracenia rosea Naczi, Case & R.B.Case, 1999

Stylidium

Around 300 species of Stylidium are currently recognised.

 Stylidium accedens Stylidium aceratum Stylidium aciculare Stylidium acuminatum Stylidium adenophorum Stylidium adnatum : Beaked triggerplant
 Stylidium adpressum : Trigger-on-stilts
 Stylidium aeonioides Stylidium affine : Queen triggerplant
 Stylidium albolilacinum Stylidium albomontis Stylidium alsinoides Stylidium amoenum : Lovely (or Beautiful) triggerplant
 Stylidium androsaceum Stylidium aquaticum Stylidium arenicola Stylidium armerium Stylidium articulatum : Stout triggerplant
 Stylidium assimile : Bronze-leaved triggerplant
 Stylidium asymmetricum : Asymmetric triggerplant
 Stylidium austrocapense Stylidium barleei : Tooth-leaved triggerplant
 Stylidium bauthas Stylidium beaugleholei Stylidium begoniifolium Stylidium bellidifolium Stylidium bicolor Stylidium breviscapum : Boomerang triggerplant
 Stylidium brunonianum : Pink fountain triggerplant
 Stylidium brunonis Stylidium bryoides Stylidium bulbiferum : Circus triggerplant
 Stylidium burbidgeanum Stylidium buxifolium Stylidium caespitosum : Fly-away triggerplant
 Stylidium calcaratum : Book triggerplant
 Stylidium candelabrum Stylidium capillare Stylidium caricifolium : Milkmaids
 Stylidium carlquistii Stylidium carnosum : Fleshy-leaved triggerplant
 Stylidium caulescens Stylidium ceratophorum Stylidium chiddarcoopingense Stylidium chinense Stylidium choreanthum : Dancing triggerplant
 Stylidium cicatricosum Stylidium ciliatum : Golden triggerplant
 Stylidium cilium Stylidium clarksonii Stylidium clavatum Stylidium claytonioides Stylidium coatesianum Stylidium compressum Stylidium confertum Stylidium confluens Stylidium cordifolium Stylidium coroniforme : Wongan Hills triggerplant
 Stylidium corymbosum : Whitecaps
 Stylidium costulatum Stylidium crassifolium : Thick-leaved triggerplant
 Stylidium crossocephalum : Posy triggerplant
 Stylidium cuneiformis Stylidium cygnorum Stylidium cymiferum Stylidium daphne Stylidium debile Stylidium delicatum Stylidium desertorum Stylidium despectum : Dwarf triggerplant
 Stylidium diceratum Stylidium dichotomum : Pins-and-needles
 Stylidium dicksonii Stylidium dielsianum : Tangle triggerplant
 Stylidium diffusum Stylidium dilatatum Stylidium diplectroglossum Stylidium dispermum Stylidium diuroides : Donkey triggerplant
 Stylidium divaricatum : Daddy-long-legs
 Stylidium divergens Stylidium diversifolium : Touch-me-not
 Stylidium drummondianum Stylidium dunlopianum Stylidium ecorne : Foot triggerplant
 Stylidium edentatum Stylidium eglandulosum : Wooly-stemmed triggerplant
 Stylidium elegans Stylidium elongatum : Tall triggerplant
 Stylidium emarginatum Stylidium ensatum Stylidium ericksonae Stylidium eriopodum Stylidium eriorhizum Stylidium evolutum Stylidium expeditionis : Tutanning triggerplant
 Stylidium falcatum : Slender beaked triggerplant

 Stylidium fimbriatum Stylidium fissilobum Stylidium flagellum Stylidium floodii Stylidium floribundum Stylidium flumense Stylidium fluminense Stylidium foveolatum Stylidium fruticosum Stylidium galioides : Yellow mountain triggerplant
 Stylidium glabrifolium Stylidium glandulosum : Bushy triggerplant
 Stylidium glandulosissimum Stylidium glaucum : Grey triggerplant
 Stylidium graminifolium : Grass triggerplant
 Stylidium guttatum : Dotted triggerplant
 Stylidium gypsophiloides Stylidium hebegynum Stylidium hirsutum : Hairy triggerplant
 Stylidium hispidum : White butterfly triggerplant
 Stylidium hortiorum Stylidium hugelii Stylidium humphreysii Stylidium imbricatum : Tile-leaved triggerplant
 Stylidium inaequipetalum Stylidium inconspicuum Stylidium induratum : Desert triggerplant
 Stylidium insensitivum : Isensitive triggerplant
 Stylidium inundatum : Hundreds and Thousands
 Stylidium inversiflorum Stylidium involucratum Stylidium ireneae Stylidium javanicum Stylidium junceum : Reed triggerplant
 Stylidium kalbarriense Stylidium keigheryi Stylidium kunthii Stylidium lachnopodum Stylidium laciniatum : Tattered triggerplant

 Stylidium laricifolium : Tree (or Larch-leaf) triggerplant
 Stylidium lateriticola Stylidium lehmannianum Stylidium leiophyllum Stylidium lepidum : Redcaps
 Stylidium leptobotrydium Stylidium leptobotrys Stylidium leptocalyx : Slender-calyxed triggerplant
 Stylidium leptophyllum : Needle-leaved triggerplant
 Stylidium leptorrhizum Stylidium leptostachyum Stylidium lessonii Stylidium leeuwinense Stylidium limbatum : Fringed-leaved triggerplant
 Stylidium lindleyanum Stylidium lineare : Narrow-leaved triggerplant
 Stylidium lineatum : Sunny triggerplant
 Stylidium lobuliflorum Stylidium longibracteatum : Long-bracted triggerplant
 Stylidium longicornu Stylidium longifolium Stylidium longissimum Stylidium longitubum : Jumping Jacks
 Stylidium lowrieanum Stylidium luteum : Yellow triggerplant
 Stylidium macranthum : Crab claws
 Stylidium maitlandianum : Fountain triggerplant
 Stylidium majus Stylidium marginatum Stylidium maritimum Stylidium marradongense Stylidium megacarpum Stylidium melastachys Stylidium merrallii : Merralls triggerplant
 Stylidium mimeticum Stylidium miniatum : Pink butterfly triggerplant
 Stylidium minus Stylidium mitchellii Stylidium mitrasacmoides Stylidium montanum Stylidium mucronatum Stylidium multiscapum Stylidium muscicola Stylidium neglectum : Neglected triggerplant
 Stylidium nominatum Stylidium nonscandens Stylidium nudum Stylidium nunagarensis : Nungarin triggerplant
 Stylidium obtusatum : Pinafore triggerplant
 Stylidium ornatum Stylidium oviflorum Stylidium pachyrrhizum Stylidium paniculatum Stylidium paulineae Stylidium pedunculatum Stylidium pendulum Stylidium periscelianthum : Pantaloon triggerplant
 Stylidium perizostera Stylidium perminutum Stylidium perpusillum : Tiny triggerplant
 Stylidium petiolare : Horned triggerplant
 Stylidium piliferum : Common butterfly triggerplant
 Stylidium pingrupense Stylidium planifolium Stylidium plantagineum : Plantagenet triggerplant
 Stylidium polystachium Stylidium preissii : Lizard triggerplant
 Stylidium pritzelianum : Royal triggerplant

 Stylidium productum Stylidium proliferum Stylidium prophyllum Stylidium propinquum Stylidium pruinosum Stylidium pseudocaespitosum Stylidium pseudohirsutum Stylidium pseudosacculatum Stylidium pseudotenellum Stylidium pubigerum : Yellow Butterfly triggerplant
 Stylidium pulchellum : Thumbelina triggerplant
 Stylidium pulviniforme Stylidium pycnostachyum : Downy triggerplant
 Stylidium pygmaeum : Pygmy triggerplant
 Stylidium quadrifurcatum : Four-pronged triggerplant
 Stylidium ramosissimum Stylidium ramosum Stylidium reductum Stylidium reduplicatum Stylidium repens : Matted triggerplant
 Stylidium rhipidium : Fan triggerplant
 Stylidium rhynchocarpum : Black-beaked triggerplant
 Stylidium ricae Stylidium rigidulum Stylidium rivulosum Stylidium robustum Stylidium roseo-alatum : Pink-wing triggerplant
 Stylidium roseonanum Stylidium roseum Stylidium rotundifolium Stylidium rubriscapum Stylidium rupestre : Rock triggerplant
 Stylidium sacculatum Stylidium scabridum : Moth triggerplant

 Stylidium scandens : Climbing triggerplant
 Stylidium scariosum Stylidium schizanthum Stylidium schoenoides : Cow Kicks
 Stylidium sejunctum Stylidium semaphorum Stylidium semipartitum Stylidium septentrionale Stylidium serrulatum Stylidium setaceum Stylidium setigerum Stylidium sidjamesii Stylidium simulans Stylidium sinicum Stylidium soboliferum Stylidium spathulatum : Creamy triggerplant
 Stylidium spinulosum : Topsy-turvy triggerplant
 Stylidium squamellosum : Maze triggerplant
 Stylidium squamosotuberosum : Fleshy-rhizomed triggerplant
 Stylidium stenophyllum Stylidium stenosepalum Stylidium stipitatum Stylidium stowardii Stylidium striatum : Fan-leaved triggerplant
 Stylidium subulatum Stylidium suffruticosum Stylidium sulcatum Stylidium symonii Stylidium tenellum Stylidium tenerrimum Stylidium tenerum Stylidium tenue Stylidium tenuicarpum Stylidium tenuifolium Stylidium tepperianum Stylidium tetrandra Stylidium thesioides : Delicate triggerplant
 Stylidium thyrsiforme Stylidium tinkeri Stylidium torticarpum Stylidium trichopodum Stylidium turbinatum Stylidium tylosum Stylidium udusicola Stylidium uliginosum Stylidium umbellatum Stylidium uniflorum : Pincushion triggerplant
 Stylidium utriculariodes : Pink fan triggerplant
 Stylidium validum Stylidium velleioides Stylidium verticillatum: Pink mountain triggerplant
 Stylidium violaceum : Violet triggerplant
 Stylidium vitiense Stylidium warriedarense Stylidium weeliwolli Stylidium wightianum Stylidium wilroyense Stylidium xanthopis : Yellow eyed triggerplant
 Stylidium yilgarnense : Yilgarn triggerplant
 Stylidium zeicolor : Maize triggerplant

Triantha
This genus contains at least 4 species, one of which was reported to be carnivorous in 2021.
 Triantha occidentalis : Western false asphodel

Triphyophyllum

This genus contains a single extant species.Triphyophyllum peltatum (Hutch. & Dalz.) Airy Shaw, 1952 (Bas.: Dioncophyllum peltatum)

UtriculariaUtricularia adpressa  Salzm. ex A.St.-Hil. & Gir., 1838Utricularia albiflora R.Br., 1810Utricularia albocaerulea Dalz., 1851Utricularia alpina  Jacq., 1760			Utricularia amethystina  Salzm. ex A.St.-Hil. & Gir., 1838Utricularia andongensis Welw. ex Hiern., 1900Utricularia antennifera P.Taylor, 1986Utricularia appendiculata  E.A.Bruce, 1934Utricularia arcuata  R.Wight, 1849Utricularia arenaria  A.DC., 1844Utricularia arnhemica  P.Taylor, 1986Utricularia asplundii P.Taylor, 1975Utricularia aurea  Lour., 1790Utricularia aureomaculata  Steyerm., 1953Utricularia australis R.Br., 1810Utricularia babui Yadav, Sardesai & Gaikwad, 2005Utricularia beaugleholei Gassin, 1993Utricularia benjaminiana Oliv., 1860Utricularia benthamii  P.Taylor, 1986Utricularia bifida L., 1753Utricularia biloba R.Br., 1810Utricularia biovularioides  (Kuhlm.) P.Taylor, 1986 (Bas.: Saccolaria biovularioides)Utricularia bisquamata	Schrank, 1824Utricularia blackmanii R.W.Jobson, 2012Utricularia blanchetii A.DC., 1844Utricularia bosminifera Ostenf., 1906Utricularia brachiata Oliv., 1859 Utricularia bracteata R.D.Good, 1924Utricularia bremii Heer, 1830Utricularia breviscapa  Wright ex Griseb., 1866Utricularia buntingiana  P.Taylor, 1975Utricularia caerulea  L., 1753Utricularia calycifida	Benj., 1847		Utricularia campbelliana Oliv., 1887Utricularia capilliflora F.Muell., 1890Utricularia cecilii P.Taylor, 1984Utricularia cheiranthos  P.Taylor, 1986Utricularia chiakiana Komiya & C.Shibata, 1997Utricularia chiribiquitensis  Fernandez-Perez, 1964Utricularia choristotheca P.Taylor, 1986Utricularia christopheri P.Taylor, 1986Utricularia chrysantha R.Br., 1810Utricularia circumvoluta P.Taylor, 1986Utricularia cochleata C.P.Bove, 2008Utricularia cornigera Studnička, 2009Utricularia cornuta Michx., 1803Utricularia corynephora P.Taylor, 1986Utricularia costata P.Taylor, 1986Utricularia cucullata A.St.-Hil. & Gir., 1838Utricularia cymbantha Welw. ex Oliv., 1865Utricularia delicatula Cheesem., 1906Utricularia delphinioides Thorel ex Pellegr., 1920Utricularia densiflora Baleeiro & C.P.Bove, 2011Utricularia determannii P.Taylor, 1986Utricularia dichotoma  Labill., 1804Utricularia dimorphantha  Makino, 1906Utricularia dunlopii  P.Taylor, 1986Utricularia dunstaniae  F.E.Lloyd, 1936Utricularia endresii  Rchb.f., 1874Utricularia erectiflora A.St.-Hil. & Gir., 1838Utricularia fimbriata  H.B.K., 1818Utricularia firmula  Welw. ex Oliv., 1865Utricularia fistulosa P.Taylor, 1986Utricularia flaccida  A.DC., 1844 Utricularia floridana  Nash, 1896Utricularia foliosa L., 1753Utricularia forrestii  P.Taylor, 1986Utricularia foveolata Edgew., 1847Utricularia fulva  F.Muell., 1858Utricularia furcellata  Oliv., 1859Utricularia garrettii P.Taylor, 1986Utricularia geminiloba  Benj., 1847Utricularia geminiscapa Benj., 1847Utricularia geoffrayi  Pellegr., 1920Utricularia georgei  P.Taylor, 1986Utricularia gibba L., 1753			Utricularia graminifolia  Vahl, 1804Utricularia guyanensis  A.DC., 1844Utricularia hamiltonii  F.E.Lloyd, 1936Utricularia helix  P.Taylor, 1986Utricularia heterochroma  Steyerm., 1953Utricularia heterosepala  Benj., 1847Utricularia hintonii  P.Taylor, 1986Utricularia hirta  Klein ex Link, 1820Utricularia hispida  Lam., 1791Utricularia holtzei  F.Muell., 1893Utricularia humboldtii	 Schomb., 1841Utricularia huntii  P.Taylor, 1986Utricularia hydrocarpa  Vahl, 1804Utricularia inaequalis  A.DC., 1844Utricularia incisa (A.Rich.) Alain, 1956 (Bas.: Drosera incisa)Utricularia inflata Walt., 1788Utricularia inflexa  Forsk., 1775Utricularia intermedia Hayne, 1800Utricularia inthanonensis Suksathan & J.Parn., 2010Utricularia involvens  Ridl., 1895Utricularia jackii J. Parn., 2005Utricularia jamesoniana Oliv., 1860Utricularia jobsonii Lowrie, 2013Utricularia juncea  Vahl, 1804Utricularia kamienskii  F.Muell., 1893Utricularia kenneallyi  P.Taylor, 1986Utricularia kimberleyensis  C.A.Gardn., 1930Utricularia kumaonensis  Oliv., 1859Utricularia laciniata  A.St.-Hil. & Gir., 1838Utricularia lasiocaulis F.Muell., 1885Utricularia lateriflora  R.Br., 1810			Utricularia laxa  A.St.-Hil. & Gir., 1838Utricularia lazulina  P.Taylor, 1984Utricularia leptoplectra  F.Muell., 1885Utricularia leptorhyncha Schwarz, 1927 Utricularia letestui  P.Taylor, 1989Utricularia limosa R.Br., 1810Utricularia linearis Wakabayashi, 2010 Utricularia livida E.Mey., 1837			Utricularia lloydii  Merl ex F.E.Lloyd, 1932Utricularia longeciliata A.DC., 1844Utricularia longifolia	 Gardn., 1842		Utricularia macrocheilos (P.Taylor) P.Taylor, 1986 (Bas.: Utricularia micropetala var.macrocheilos) Utricularia macrorhiza  Le Conte, 1824Utricularia malabarica  Janarthanam & Henry, 1989Utricularia mangshanensis G.W.Hu, 2007Utricularia mannii Oliv., 1865Utricularia menziesii	R.Br., 1810		Utricularia meyeri  Pilger, 1901Utricularia microcalyx (P.Taylor) P.Taylor, 1971 (Bas.: Utricularia welwitschii var.microcalyx) Utricularia micropetala  Sm., 1819Utricularia minor L., 1753Utricularia minutissima Vahl, 1804Utricularia mirabilis  P.Taylor, 1986Utricularia moniliformis P.Taylor, 1986Utricularia muelleri Kam., 1894Utricularia multicaulis  Oliv., 1859Utricularia multifida  R.Br., 1810Utricularia myriocista  A.St.-Hil. & Gir., 1838Utricularia nana  A.St.-Hil. & Gir., 1838Utricularia naviculata  P.Taylor, 1967Utricularia nelumbifolia Gardn., 1852Utricularia neottioides  A.St.-Hil. & Gir., 1838Utricularia nephrophylla Benj., 1847 Utricularia nervosa  G.Weber ex Benj., 1847Utricularia nigrescens  Sylven, 1909Utricularia ochroleuca  Hartm., 1857		Utricularia odontosepala Stapf, 1912Utricularia odorata  Pellegr., 1920Utricularia olivacea  Wright ex Griseb., 1866Utricularia oliveriana  Steyerm., 1953Utricularia panamensis  Steyerm. ex P.Taylor, 1986Utricularia parthenopipes P.Taylor, 1986Utricularia paulineae  Lowrie, 1998Utricularia pentadactyla  P.Taylor, 1954Utricularia peranomala P.Taylor, 1986Utricularia perversa P.Taylor, 1986Utricularia petersoniae P.Taylor, 1986Utricularia petertaylorii A.Lowrie, 2002Utricularia phusoidaoensis Suksathan & J.Parn., 2010Utricularia physoceras  P.Taylor, 1986Utricularia pierrei Pellegr., 1920Utricularia platensis  Speg., 1899Utricularia pobeguinii Pellegr., 1914Utricularia poconensis  Fromm, 1985Utricularia podadena P.Taylor, 1964Utricularia polygaloides Edgew., 1847Utricularia praelonga	A.St.-Hil. & Gir., 1838		Utricularia praeterita  P.Taylor, 1983Utricularia praetermissa P.Taylor, 1976Utricularia prehensilis E.Mey., 1837Utricularia pubescens Sm., 1819	Utricularia pulchra  P.Taylor, 1977Utricularia punctata Wall. ex A.DC., 1844Utricularia purpurea Wlat., 1788Utricularia purpureocaerulea A.St.-Hil. & Gir., 1838Utricularia pusilla Vahl, 1804Utricularia quelchii N.E.Br., 1901Utricularia quinquedentata F.Muell. ex P.Taylor, 1986Utricularia radiata Small, 1903Utricularia raynalii P.Taylor, 1986Utricularia recta P.Taylor, 1986Utricularia reflexa Oliv., 1865Utricularia regia Zamudio & Olvera, 2009Utricularia reniformis	A.St.-Hil., 1830		Utricularia resupinata Greene, 1840Utricularia reticulata Sm., 1805Utricularia rhododactylos P.Taylor, 1986Utricularia rigida Benj., 1847Utricularia rostrata A.Fleischm. & Rivadavia, 2009Utricularia salwinensis Hand.-Mazz., 1936Utricularia sandersonii Oliv., 1865			Utricularia sandwithii P.Taylor, 1967Utricularia scandens Benj., 1847Utricularia schultesii Fernandez-Perez, 1964Utricularia simmonsii Lowrie, Cowie & Conran, 2008Utricularia simplex R.Br., 1810Utricularia simulans Pilger, 1914Utricularia singeriana F.Muell., 1891Utricularia smithiana R.Wight, 1849Utricularia spiralis Sm., 1819Utricularia spinomarginata Suksathan & J.Parn., 2010Utricularia spruceana  Benth. ex Oliv., 1860Utricularia stanfieldii P.Taylor, 1963Utricularia steenisii P.Taylor, 1986Utricularia stellaris L.f., 1781Utricularia steyermarkii P.Taylor, 1967Utricularia striata Le Conte ex Torr., 1819Utricularia striatula Sm., 1819Utricularia stygia Thor, 1988Utricularia subramanyamii Janarthanam & Henry, 1989Utricularia subulata L., 1753Utricularia tenella R.Br., 1810Utricularia tenuissima Tutin, 1934Utricularia terrae-reginae P.Taylor, 1986Utricularia tetraloba P.Taylor, 1963Utricularia tortilis Welw. ex Oliv., 1865Utricularia trichophylla Spruce ex Oliv., 1860Utricularia tricolor	A.St.-Hil., 1833		Utricularia tridactyla P.Taylor, 1986Utricularia tridentata Sylven, 1909Utricularia triflora P.Taylor, 1986Utricularia triloba Benj., 1847Utricularia troupinii P.Taylor, 1971Utricularia tubulata  F.Muell., 1875Utricularia uliginosa Vahl, 1804Utricularia uniflora R.Br., 1810Utricularia unifolia Ruiz & Pav., 1797Utricularia uxoris Gómez-Laur., 2005Utricularia violacea R.Br., 1810Utricularia viscosa  Spruce ex Oliv., 1860Utricularia vitellina Ridl., 1923Utricularia volubilis R.Br., 1810Utricularia vulgaris L., 1753Utricularia warburgii Goebel, 1891Utricularia warmingii Kam., 1894Utricularia welwitschii Oliv., 1865Utricularia westonii P.Taylor, 1986Utricularia wightiana P.Taylor, 1986

Extinct species
Aldrovanda
Numerous extinct species of Aldrovanda have been described, all of which are known only from fossil pollen and seeds (with the exception of A. inopinata, which is also known from fossilised laminae).

†Aldrovanda borysthenica†Aldrovanda clavata†Aldrovanda dokturovskyi†Aldrovanda eleanorae†Aldrovanda europaea†Aldrovanda inopinata†Aldrovanda intermedia†Aldrovanda kuprianovae†Aldrovanda megalopolitana†Aldrovanda nana†Aldrovanda ovata†Aldrovanda praevesiculosa†Aldrovanda rugosa†Aldrovanda sibirica†Aldrovanda sobolevii†Aldrovanda unica†Aldrovanda zussii†Archaeamphora

This genus contains a single extinct species, described from fossilised leaf material. The identification of Archaeamphora as a pitcher plant (and therefore carnivorous plant) has been questioned by a number of authors.Heřmanová, Z. & J. Kvaček (2010). Late Cretaceous Palaeoaldrovanda, not seeds of a carnivorous plant, but eggs of an insect . Journal of the National Museum (Prague), Natural History Series, 179(9): 105–118.

†Archaeamphora longicervia Li, 2005

†Droserapites
This is a form taxon known only from fossil pollen.

†Droserapites clavatus Huang, 1978

†Droserapollis
This is a form taxon known only from fossil pollen.

†Droserapollis gemmatus Huang, 1978
†Droserapollis khasiensis Kumar, 1995
†Droserapollis lusaticus (Krutzsch, 1959)
†Droserapollis taiwanensis Shaw, 1999

†Droseridites
This is a form taxon known only from fossil pollen. Three species of the "Droseridites echinosporus group" have been transferred to the genus Nepenthes (see below).

†Droseridites baculatus Ibrahim, 1996
†Droseridites parvus Dutta & Sah, 1970
†Droseridites senonicus Jardiné & Magloire, 1965
†Droseridites spinosus (Cookson) R.Potonié, 1960

†Fischeripollis
This is a form taxon known only from fossil pollen.

†Fischeripollis halensis Truswell & Marchant, 2051
†Fischeripollis krutschei Muller, 2039
†Fischeripollis undulatusNepenthes
Three species known only from fossil pollen and originally assigned to Droseridites have been transferred to the genus Nepenthes.

†Nepenthes echinatus (Hunger) Krutzsch, 1985
†Nepenthes echinosporus (R.Potonié) Krutzsch, 1985
†Nepenthes major (Krutzsch) Krutzsch, 1985

†Nepenthidites
This is a form taxon known only from fossil pollen. Droseridites major (Nepenthes major) and Droseridites parvus are considered synonyms of Nepenthidites laitryngewensis by some authorities.

†Nepenthidites laitryngewensis Kumar, 1995

†Palaeoaldrovanda
This is a form taxon known only from what were originally described as fossil seeds. These supposed seeds have subsequently been identified as insect eggs.

†Palaeoaldrovanda splendens Knobloch & Mai, 1984

†Saxonipollis
This is a form taxon known only from fossil pollen.

†Saxonipollis saxonicus'' Krutzsch, 1970

See also
List of Nepenthes natural hybrids
Nepenthes classification

References

Carnivorous Plant Database

 List
Carnivorous